The Bolted Door is a 1923 American drama film directed by William Worthington and written by George Randolph Chester. It is based on the 1910 novel The Bolted Door by George Gibbs. The film stars Frank Mayo, Charles A. Stevenson, Phyllis Haver, Nigel Barrie, Kathleen Kirkham, and Frank Whitson. The film was released on March 5, 1923, by Universal Pictures.

Cast          
Frank Mayo as Brooke Garriott
Charles A. Stevenson as Oliver Judson
Phyllis Haver as Natalie Judson
Nigel Barrie as Rene Deland
Kathleen Kirkham as Natalie's Chum
Frank Whitson as Attorney Bronson
Bertram Anderson-Smith as Attorney Rowe
Calvert Carter as Butler

References

External links
 

1923 films
1920s English-language films
Silent American drama films
1923 drama films
Universal Pictures films
Films directed by William Worthington
American silent feature films
American black-and-white films
1920s American films